Darryl Julian Geurts (born 5 July 1994) is a German footballer who plays as a left winger for BFC Dynamo.

Career
On 13 June 2019 VfR Aalen announced, that Geurts would join the club from the 2019/20 season. Before VfR Aalen had received his rights, Geurts regret the transfer and was instead set to join FSV Union Fürstenwalde.

References

External links
 

1994 births
Living people
People from Stolberg (Rhineland)
Sportspeople from Cologne (region)
German footballers
Footballers from North Rhine-Westphalia
Association football midfielders
FSV Union Fürstenwalde players
FC Energie Cottbus II players
SC Paderborn 07 players
FC Rot-Weiß Erfurt players
VfR Aalen players
Berliner FC Dynamo players
Regionalliga players
3. Liga players
Holstein Kiel II players